Black and Blonde stylized as Black & Blonde is the debut extended play by British recording artist Rainy Milo, released on 22 April 2013 through Universal Music. The extended play is Milo's first body of work after signing a contract with Universal. The extended play was released after Milo released her mixtape Limey (2012) which gained universal acclaim.

Sonically the album featured hip hop, alternative and jazz genres. All of the songs from the extended play were written by Milo except "Bankrobber" which is a rendition of the 1980 song of the same name by English punk rock band The Clash, the EP also included "Don't Regret Me" from Milo's previous mixtape.

In order to promote the extended play Milo released a video for her cover of "Bankrobber", the video included two scenes one of Milo and a "mug shot" and the other sees Milo robbing a bank. Rainy also performed at Cargo in London on 21 May and at Field Day Festival in London on 25 May, as well as shows in Brighton and Bristol in May 2013.

Background

Milo started singing with local musicians and arts collectives when she was fourteen, During Milo's childhood she tried to surround herself with inspiring people.
Milo began surfing the internet for jazz-inspired hip-hop beats she could sing over, whilst surfing the internet she came across a beat by producer BLCK RSSN. Milo recorded over the beat and the track became her debut recording entitled "Bout You", the song caught the attention of Gilles Peterson for his Brownswood Bubblers compilation series. Milo received various offers from record labels but turned them down as she felt it was too early. Milo began working on first mixtape entitled Limey, produced by Cole MGN. Milo released her mixape in October 2012 which gained large amounts of acclaim from critics who called the mixtape a "perfect soundtrack" and praising its "chilly atmospherics and lyrics." Critics also praised Milo's vocals noting them as "startling" and "smoking".
In March 2013 a signed recording contract with Mercury and Universal and began working on her debut EP.

Composition
The EP's opening track "Bankrobber" last for three minutes and three seconds, the song is a cover of The Clash’s 1980 single of the same name. "Bankrobber contains "rough sultry vocals and R&B influences". Critics praised the song praising the "rich honeyed tones" compliment the "super smooth interpretation of The Clash."
Milo commented on the composition of the song saying she added a "Milo twist."

"Don't Regret Me" is the EP's final song and was also included as the second song on Milo's previous mixtape's, produced by Chet Faker, Eldad Guetta and Daje. The song contains "atmospheric styling" and lyrically revolves around Millo begging an "ex-lover to not regret her and not forget her."

Reception
Critics praised the extended play and praised Milo's cover of "Bankrobber", commenting that Milo's music is soon to be on radio's saying "It’s likely, indeed, that her colourful sounds will be swirling through the airwaves before long".

Track listing

Personnel
Daje - vocals and mixing
Eldad Guetta - vocal producer
Cole M.G.N. - music producer

Release history

References 

2013 debut EPs
Rainy Milo albums
Hip hop EPs
Rock EPs
Albums free for download by copyright owner